Marilyn Times Five is a 1973 experimental film by American filmmaker Bruce Conner.

Plot
It is an exploration of how a film's form can influence audience perception of the content of film.

For this film, the footage comes from Apple Knockers and Coke, a famous porno loop from the late '40s featuring Monroe look-alike Arline Hunter
while the song "I'm Through With Love"  by Marilyn herself is playing.

See also
1973 in film
Pop art
Found object

References

External links 
 

1970s avant-garde and experimental films
1973 films
American short films
Films directed by Bruce Conner
Collage film
Marilyn Monroe
1970s American films